The Sirène  was a 40-gun Coquille class frigate of the French Navy. She took part in a number of campaigns and actions before she was badly damaged in a battle on 22 March 1808. Refloated after being beached to avoid capture, she was hulked. Sirène was broken up in 1825.

French Revolutionary Wars

Begun as Fidèle, she was commissioned as Sirène in May 1795 under Lieutenant Charles Berrenger. She took part in the Expédition d'Irlande.

Glenmore recaptured Calcutta while Aimable engaged Sirène and Bergère. A 35-minute action ensued before the two French vessels departed. Sirène had as prisoners Captain Haggy, Calcuttas master, her first and second mates, and 50 of her lascars and seamen. Calcutta arrived in Plymouth on 12 January 1800.

Napoleonic wars

On 8 June 1805 Sirène was part of a Franco-Spanish fleet under Admiral Villeneuve, which intercepted a homeward-bound convoy of 15 merchant vessels under the escort of the frigate   and the schooner or sloop . The two British warships managed to escape, but Villeneuve's fleet captured the entire convoy, valued at some five million pounds. Villeneuve sent the convoy to Guadeloupe under Sirènes escort. However, as she was escorting the prizes, she encountered several British frigates. She escaped after burning the merchantmen.

Sirène took part in the Battle of Cape Finisterre on 22 July 1805. In March of the following year, she took part in an expedition to destroy English whaling ships.

The French burnt their captures. Sirène also captured two other whalers, Lion, of Liverpool, and Molly, of Hull.

In March 1808, Sirène, under Guy-Victor Duperré, and the 44-gun , under Captain Hugues Méquet, ferried troops to Martinique. 

The French put the crews on Sofia, Delaney, master, of and for New York, which brought the crews into Plymouth on 26 March. Sofia had been coming from Belfast.

On 22 March Sirène and Italienne encountered a British squadron comprising the 74-gun HMS Impetueux (Captain John Lawford) and HMS Saturn, as well as the frigates HMS Aigle (Captain George Wolfe) and HMS Narcissus, which chased them. It seemed at first that the French squadron would easily beat the British to Lorient, but as they closed to shore, the wind became too weak and the frigates had to be taken in tow by their boats. By the time wind had returned, Impetueux and Aigle had closed so much that Duperré deemed it impossible to reach Lorient before being caught, and he decided to seek the support of the batteries at Groix. At 20:30, Sirène was taken in a cross-fire of Aigle, which sailed between her and shore, and Impetueux on the other side. The gunnery exchange lasted one hour and a quarter, after which the British withdrew. Fearing that the British would attack again before he could moor Sirène in a strong defensive position, Duperré beached her at Pointe des Chats, under the Lacroix battery. Sirène was refloated on 26 March, and rejoined Italienne in Lorient harbour. This action was immortalised by a painting by Pierre-Julien Gilbert. In British literature, Sirène is sometimes mistaken for Seine.

Fate
Too badly damaged to be repaired, Sirène was used as a hulk in Lorient. She was broken up in 1825.

Notes

Citations

References

Coquille-class frigates
1795 ships
Ships built in France